"Little, Little Love" is the third and final single taken from beFour's second debut album All 4 One, in Germany, Austria and Switzerland. As of September 30, the song has officially entered the German Singles Chart.

Formats and track listings
These are the formats and track listings of major single releases of "Little, Little Love".

Maxi CD single
"Little, Little Love" (Single version) – 3:13
"I Wanna Be Like You" - 3:36
"Little Little Love" (Karaoke version)- 3:13
"All4One Album-Medley" - 2:48

Digital Download
"Little, Little Love" (Single version) – 3:13
"I Wanna Be Like You" - 3:36
"Little Little Love" (Karaoke version)- 3:13
"All4One Album-Medley" - 2:48

Charts

2007 songs
BeFour songs
Songs written by Christian Geller
Song recordings produced by Christian Geller